Prime Prine is a compilation album by American folk singer John Prine, released in 1976.  It concluded Prine's run with Atlantic Records.  No one associated with Prine had anything to do with the release, with the singer telling Goldmine in 1992, "A friend of ours in the art department called us one night and snuck us into the place...so we could at least look at the cover before it came out."

Reception

Writing retrospectively for Allmusic, critic William Ruhlman commented of the album, "Atlantic Records' compilation of John Prine's first four albums was good for its time...but was later superseded by Rhino's Great Days anthology."

Track listing

Chart positions

References

1976 compilation albums
John Prine albums
Atlantic Records compilation albums